Andrei Sergeyevich Smirnov (born March 12, 1941) is a Soviet and Russian actor and filmmaker who is known for directing the films Belorussian Station (1971), Autumn (1974) and A Frenchman (2019). He was a member of the jury at the 38th Berlin International Film Festival in 1988. 

In 2003 he was awarded the title of People's Artist of Russia.

Early life and education
Andrei Smirnov was born in Moscow to the family of writer Sergey Smirnov, author of books about the defenders of the Brest Fortress. When he was in seventh grade, the family moved to Maryina Roshcha District, where Andrei continued his studies in a special French school.

After finishing school, he was accepted into the directing department of VGIK in Moscow, Mikhail Romm's workshop. He graduated in 1962.

Career
As a director, he made his debut with the war film The Land of the Earth (1964, together with Boris Yashin) based on the story of the same name by Grigory Baklanov.

Andrei Smirnov's first great success came when he directed the 1971 drama film Belorussian Station, which showed the psychological atmosphere of events closely intertwined with the memory of the Great Patriotic War.

In his next film, Autumn (1974), he turned to the theme of love, with an unusual for that time boldness about the relationship between the thirty-year-old man and woman.

After the film Faith and Truth (1979), devoted to different stages of the construction of Moscow, Smirnov decided to leave filmmaking. The reason was the criticism of various authorities and dissatisfaction with his own work.

Smirnov began to work mainly as a screenwriter and playwright. His play My Own in 1985 was staged by the Moscow Satire Theatre.

He wrote screenplays for the films Sentimental Journey to Potatoes (1986), I Did Everything I Could (1986), and also the episodes The Medicine of Fear in the second season of television series Beyond the Wolves (2004).

In the 1990s, Smirnov staged television performances, television concerts, and theater productions. Among them - Dinner in the Moscow Art Theatre - Theater-Studio O. Tabakov (1994), A Month in the Country in Comédie-Française (1997).

In 2011, he returned to filmmaking and made a national drama Once Upon a Time There Lived a Simple Woman, acting simultaneously as a screenwriter and producer. The film won the Nika Award for best film. It also received four more Nika Awards - for best script work, best female role, best supporting actor and best costume design.

His 2019 film A Frenchman won several awards, including Nika Awards for best film and best director.

Acting roles 
Smirnov has starred in a number of notable roles as an actor, including the main roles in the films Chernov (1990) by Sergei Yursky, His Wife's Diary (2000) by Alexei Uchitel, Fathers and Sons (2008) by Avdotya Smirnova and Elena (2011) by Andrey Zvyagintsev. Smirnov also starred in the series The Right to Defense (2002), The Idiot (2003), The Instructor (2003), Moscow Saga (2004), The First Circle (2006), The Apostle (2008) ), Heavy Sand (2008), Churchill (2009), The Thaw (2013), and Black Cats (2013).

Other roles and activities 
Smirnov was engaged in public activities. In 1988-1990, he was Acting First Secretary of the Union of Cinematographers of the USSR.

Between 1987-1995 he was the artistic director of the studio "Debut".

He taught at the High Courses for Scriptwriters and Film Directors.

Personal life
Andrei Smirnov is married with a second marriage to Honored Artist of Russia Elena Prudnikova. His first wife was actress Natalia Rudnaya. Smirnov has two daughters from his first marriage — Avdotya and Alexander, from the second — a daughter, Aglaya, and a son, Alexey. Dunya Smirnova is a well-known screenwriter and director, she co-hosted  the television program "School of Scandal". Andrei acted in her films Gisele's Mania, His Wife's Diary, Fathers and Sons, Two Days.

He condemned the annexation of Crimea in 2014 and supported the 2020–2021 Belarusian protests.

Selected filmography

Actor
 His Wife's Diary (2000)
 The Idiot (TV, 2003)
 Elena (2011)
 Two Days (2011)
 The Thaw (TV, 2013)
 Moscow Saga (TV, 2014)

Director
 Belorussian station (1970)
 Autumn (1974)
 Once Upon a Time There Lived a Simple Woman (2011)
 A Frenchman'' (2019)

Honours and awards
 Order "For Merit to the Fatherland", 4th class
 People's Artist of Russia
 Grand Prize at the I Festival of contemporary cinema in Karlovy Vary (1971) - for the film "Belorussian Station"
 For his performance as the writer Ivan Bunin in "His Wife's Diary", Smirnov won several awards:
 Frieda B. Prize at the VI International Human Rights Film Festival "Stalker" (2000)
 Best Actor prize - Minsk International Film Festival Listapad (2000)
 Best Actor prize - National Prize of the Russian Academy of Cinema Arts (Nika Award) (2000)
 Best Actor prize - 7th Gatchina Festival "Literature and Cinema" (2001)
 Prize of the President of the Festival, XIX Festival in Vyborg (August 2011) - for "Window to Europe"
 Grand Prize at the 22nd Open Russian Film Festival Kinotavr (June 2011)
 Nika Award (2011) - for the film "Once Upon a Time There Lived a Simple Woman" in the "Best Screenplay" and his film named "Best Feature Film"

References

External links

1941 births
20th-century Russian male actors
20th-century Russian male writers
20th-century Russian screenwriters
21st-century Russian male actors
21st-century Russian male writers
21st-century Russian screenwriters
Living people
Male actors from Moscow
Academicians of the National Academy of Motion Picture Arts and Sciences of Russia
Gerasimov Institute of Cinematography alumni
People's Artists of Russia
Recipients of the Nika Award
Recipients of the Order "For Merit to the Fatherland", 4th class
Male screenwriters
Russian activists against the 2022 Russian invasion of Ukraine
Russian film directors
Russian male film actors
Russian theatre directors
Soviet film directors
Soviet male film actors
Soviet screenwriters